Now Barabbas is a play by the British writer William Douglas Home. Its original West End run at the Vaudeville Theatre lasted for 130 performances from 7 March to 28 June 1947. It concerns a variety of inmates at a British prison, including new arrivals, old hands and a convicted murderer sentenced to hang. The original cast included Jill Bennett. The title refers to Barabbas the robber of biblical tradition.

Film adaptation
In 1949 the play was made into a film Now Barabbas starring Richard Greene, Cedric Hardwicke, Kenneth More and Richard Burton.

References

Bibliography
 Wearing, J.P. The London Stage 1940-1949: A Calendar of Productions, Performers, and Personnel.  Rowman & Littlefield, 2014.

1947 plays
British plays adapted into films